Kurian Joseph (born 30 November 1953) is a former Judge of the Supreme Court of India. Previously, he has served as Chief Justice of Himachal Pradesh High Court and Judge of Kerala High Court.

Early life
Kurian Joseph was born on 30 November 1953 in Manjapra a village near Angamaly. He was educated at St. Joseph's U.P. School, Chengal, Kalady, St. Sebastian's High School, Kanjoor. For higher education, he attended Bharata Mata College, Thrikkakara and Sree Sankara College, both affiliated colleges of Mahatma Gandhi University, and Kerala Law Academy, University of Kerala in Trivandrum.

Career
Joseph began his legal career in 1979. He was member of the Academic Council, Kerala University from 1977 to 1978, General Secretary of Kerala University Union in 1978, Senate member of Cochin University from 1983 to 1985, member of the Board of Studies, Indian Legal Thought of Mahatma Gandhi University in 1996, President, Kerala Judicial Academy from 2006 to 2008, Chairman of Kerala High Court Legal Services Committee from 2006 to 2009 and Chairman of Lakshadweep Legal Services Authority in 2008. He was designated as Senior Advocate in 1996. Joseph has also been Chairman of the Indian Law Institute Kerala Branch, Chairman of Indian Law Reports (Kerala Series) and Executive Member of NUALS (National University of Advanced Legal Studies).

In 2000, Kurian Joseph was appointed a judge of the Kerala High Court. In February 2010, he was elevated as Chief Justice of the Himachal Pradesh High Court. On 8 March 2013, he became a judge of Supreme Court of India.

Joseph believes that people have high expectations of the judiciary and that it should play a pro-active role to meet their aspirations.

Notable cases
The bench of Justice R. M. Lodha, Justice Madan Lokur and Justice Joseph is hearing the controversial coal allocation scam case and vowed to free the Central Bureau of Investigation (CBI) from any political and bureaucratic interference. A bench of Chief Justice Lodha, Kurian Joseph and R. F. Nariman overruled the Afsal Guru decision on the point of admissibility of electronic evidence.

On 22 August 2017, Justice Joseph gave a verdict against the controversial Triple Talaq. In his judgement he said, "I find it extremely difficult to agree with the learned Chief Justice that the practice of triple talaq has to be considered integral to the religious denomination in question and that the same is part of their personal law...."

Post retirement
Joseph has been appointed the arbitrator on behalf of the government of Kerala in the dispute with Adani Group over the completion of Vizhinjam Port in Kerala.

References

1953 births
Living people
Malayali people
Indian Christians
Saint Thomas Christians
Justices of the Supreme Court of India
Judges of the Kerala High Court
Chief Justices of the Himachal Pradesh High Court
20th-century Indian judges
People from Ernakulam district
Advocates General for Indian states
21st-century Indian judges
21st-century Indian lawyers
20th-century Indian lawyers
University of Kerala alumni
Mahatma Gandhi University, Kerala alumni